The 1991 San Diego Padres season was the 23rd season in franchise history.

Offseason
 December 3, 1990: Frank Seminara was drafted by the San Diego Padres from the New York Yankees in the 1990 rule 5 draft.
 December 12, 1990: Mark Parent was traded by the Padres to the Texas Rangers for Scott Coolbaugh.
 February 8, 1991: Jim Vatcher was selected off waivers by the Padres from the Atlanta Braves.

Blockbuster Deal
On December 4, 1990, the Padres traded second baseman Roberto Alomar and outfielder Joe Carter to the Toronto Blue Jays in exchange for first baseman Fred McGriff and shortstop Tony Fernández. Blue Jays GM Pat Gillick and Padres GM Joe McIlvaine originally talked about just trading Joe Carter for Fred McGriff. The Padres were losing Jack Clark and needed a new first baseman. The Blue Jays had John Olerud ready to take over at first base but were losing outfielder George Bell. Gillick decided to up the ante by trying to get Roberto Alomar. Gillick figured that with Garry Templeton in the twilight of his career, Fernández would be an adequate replacement. Alomar feuded with Padres manager Greg Riddoch and the thinking was that Bip Roberts and Joey Cora could platoon at second base. Alomar and Carter would go on to help the Toronto Blue Jays win the 1992 World Series and 1993 World Series.

Regular season
Atlanta Braves pitchers Kent Mercker, Mark Wohlers and Alejandro Pena combined for a no-hitter on September 11, 1991 in a 1-0 shutout win over the San Diego Padres. The 13th no-hitter in Braves franchise history, attendance was 20,477 at Fulton-County Stadium.

Opening Day starters
Shawn Abner
Jerald Clark
Tony Fernández
Tony Gwynn
Fred McGriff
Jim Presley
Bip Roberts
Benito Santiago
Ed Whitson

Season standings

Record vs. opponents

Notable transactions
 April 5, 1991: Mike Aldrete was signed as a free agent by the Padres.
 May 10, 1991: Mike Aldrete was released by the San Diego Padres.
 July 30, 1991: Shawn Abner was traded by the Padres to the California Angels for Jack Howell.

Roster

Player stats

Batting

Starters by position
Note: Pos = Position; G = Games played; AB = At bats; H = Hits; Avg. = Batting average; HR = Home runs; RBI = Runs batted in

Other batters
Note: G = Games played; AB = At bats; H = Hits; Avg. = Batting average; HR = Home runs; RBI = Runs batted in

Pitching

Starting pitchers
Note: G = Games pitched; IP = Innings pitched; W = Wins; L = Losses; ERA = Earned run average; SO = Strikeouts

Other pitchers
Note: G = Games pitched; IP = Innings pitched; W = Wins; L = Losses; ERA = Earned run average; SO = Strikeouts

Relief pitchers
Note: G = Games pitched; W = Wins; L = Losses; SV = Saves; ERA = Earned run average; SO = Strikeouts

Awards and honors

1991 Major League Baseball All-Star Game

Farm system

LEAGUE CHAMPIONS: High Desert

References

External links
 1991 San Diego Padres at Baseball Reference
 1991 San Diego Padres at Baseball Almanac

San Diego Padres seasons
San Diego Padres season
San Diego Padres